Simmons Lake is a lake 1.5 miles (2.4 km) long in the east part of Simmons Basin, Victoria Land. Named by Advisory Committee on Antarctic Names (US-ACAN) in 1992 in association with Simmons Basin after biologist George M. Simmons, Jr.

References

Lakes of Victoria Land
Scott Coast